Maguk (Barramundi Gorge) is located in the south of Kakadu National Park in the Northern Territory, Australia.

Maguk is one of the only waterfalls in Kakadu that flows while there is no rain. Towards the end of the dry season however, the flow is much weaker than in the peak of the wet season.

Facilities 
 Car park
 Public Toilet

See also 
 Kakadu National Park

External links
 Kakadu-Attractions

Kakadu National Park